The 2002–03 season was the 103rd season in Società Sportiva Lazio's history and their 15th consecutive season in the top-flight of Italian football. Under new manager Roberto Mancini, Lazio finished 4th in Serie A and reached the semi-finals of both the Coppa Italia and the UEFA Cup.

Summary
Owing to financial worries club President Sergio Cragnotti sold out several players including club legend defender Alessandro Nesta to A.C. Milan, forward Hernan Crespo to Inter and Gaizka Mendieta was loaned out to FC Barcelona. Also, the new arrivals were young coach Roberto Mancini along low-profile players such as Bernardo Corradi from Chievo Verona and Enrico Chiesa. On 3 January 2003 a majority of club shareholders appointed Ugo Longo as its new president finishing Cragnotti 10-yr-term.

Squad

Transfers

Winter

Serie A

League table

Results by round

Results summary

Matches

Top scorers
  Claudio López 15 (4)
  Bernardo Corradi 10
  Diego Simeone 6
  Stefano Fiore 6
  Dejan Stanković 5

Coppa Italia

Eightfinals

Quarterfinals

Semifinals

UEFA Cup

First round

Second round

Third round

Eightfinals

Quarter-final

Semi-final

Statistics

Players statistics

References

Sources
  RSSSF - Italy 2002/03

S.S. Lazio seasons
Lazio